Eurytela narinda is a butterfly in the family Nymphalidae. It is found on Madagascar. The habitat consists of primary forests.

References

Butterflies described in 1872
Biblidinae
Butterflies of Africa
Endemic fauna of Madagascar
Taxa named by Christopher Ward (entomologist)